Competitor for  Canada

Otto Lorne Christman (February 20, 1880 – September 26, 1963) was a Canadian amateur soccer player who competed in the 1904 Summer Olympics. In 1904 Christman was a member of the Galt F.C. team, which won the gold medal in the soccer tournament. He played one match as a midfielder. He died in 1963 in Orillia, Ontario, and is buried in the Elmira Union Cemetery in Waterloo County, Ontario.

References

External links
Otto Christman's profile at Sports Reference.com

1880 births
1963 deaths
Canadian soccer players
Association football midfielders
Footballers at the 1904 Summer Olympics
Olympic gold medalists for Canada
Olympic soccer players of Canada
Soccer people from Ontario
Olympic medalists in football
Medalists at the 1904 Summer Olympics